Lenk im Simmental railway station is a railway station in the municipality of Lenk im Simmental, in the Swiss canton of Bern. It is the eastern terminus of the  Montreux–Lenk im Simmental line of the Montreux Oberland Bernois Railway.

Services 
The following services stop at Lenk im Simmental:

References

External links 
 
 

Railway stations in the canton of Bern
Montreux Oberland Bernois Railway stations